Footlight Fever is a 1941 sequel to the 1940 comedy Curtain Call, with Alan Mowbray and Donald MacBride.

Plot
Alan Mowbray and Donald MacBride reprise their roles as theatrical producers Donald Avery and Geoffrey 'Jeff' Crandall. This time they try to con a millionairess into funding their latest show by posing as old friends of her lost love.

Cast
 Alan Mowbray as Avery
 Donald MacBride as Crandall
 Elisabeth Risdon as Aunt Hattie
 Lee Bonnell as John Carter
 Elyse Knox as Eileen Drake
 Charles Quigley as Spike

Production
It lost $40,000 at the box office.

References

External links

1941 films
Films directed by Irving Reis
1941 comedy films
American comedy films
American sequel films
American black-and-white films
1940s American films